Sevastyanov is a Russian masculine surname, its feminine counterpart is Sevastyanova. The name is derived from the male given name Sebastian and means literally Sebastian's. It may refer to:

Karolina Sevastyanova (born 1995), Russian group rhythmic gymnast
Nikolay Sevastyanov (born 1961), Russian engineer
Pavel Sevastyanov, Soviet football manager
Vitaly Sevastyanov (1935–2010), Soviet cosmonaut
 P. I. Sevastyanov, 19th century Russian scholar who took the first photographs of Hilandar manuscripts and acts, in 1851, 1857|58 and 1859/60, sponsored by the Russian Imperial Academy.
Russian-language surnames
Patronymic surnames
Surnames from given names